Paul Dunford (14 January 1949 – 9 June 2002), professionally billed as Paul Chubb, was an Australian film, television and stage actor and scriptwriter primarily in genres of comedy and drama.

Early life
He was born in Arncliffe, a suburb of Sydney. and had a brother Greg, (Timothy Bean).

Career
He began his career as an "everyman" character actor by studying under Hayes Gordon at the Ensemble Theatre and began to appear in television commercials, soap-operas including Number 96, and television dramas. He wrote and acted in pub plays and pantomimes and segued to feature film work such as with Julie Forsyth in Stan and George's New Life (1990), which "remains a defining portrayal in a body of work that includes Così, Bliss and Road To Nhill," a total of 22 feature films.

Chubb guest-starred as a State Member of Parliament Patrick Rafferty (Michael Rafferty's brother), in Rafferty's Rules.

Personal life and death
He died due to post operative cardiomyopathy complications, in 2002 in Newcastle, New South Wales.

Filmography

Films
Dirty Deeds (2002)
Bondi Banquet (1999) as Bart L. Booth
Road to Nhill (1997), as Maurie
The Well (1997), as Harry Bird
Così (1996), as Henry
The Roly Poly Man (1994), as Dirk Trent
Big Ideas (1993) 
Shotgun Wedding (1993), as Geoffrey Drinkwater
Singapore Sling (1993), as Cray
Mad Bomber in Love (1992), as Sven
Stan and George's New Life (1991), as Stanley Harris
Sweet Talker (1991), as Billy
Dead to the World (1991), as Sergeant Jack Grant
Golden Braid (1990), as Joseph
Touch the Sun: Peter & Pompey (1988), as Mayor Leo Bainbridge
Danger Down Under (1988), as Dennis Quinn
Bullseye (1987), as Don McKenzie
With Love to the Person Next to Me (1987), as Syd
Hunger (1986), as Caffrey
Bliss (1985), as Reverend Des
The Coca-Cola Kid (1985), as Fred
A Girl's Own Story (1984), as Father
Goodbye Paradise (1983), as Curly
Passionless Moments (1983), as Jim Simpson
Heatwave (1982), as Detective 2
Kitty and the Bagman (1982), as Slugger
Hoodwink (1981), as Reid
The Night the Prowler (1978), as Police Officer 1

Television
All Saints (2002)
The Farm (2001) as Ron Oakes
Water Rats (2001)
Home and Away (1999-2000) as Jack Brown
Count me in – Combinatorics: The Art of Counting (1993)
Stark (1993), as Mayor
Big Ideas (1992), as Noel Draper
Betty's Bunch (1990), as Arthur Quinter 'The Con'
The Paper Man (1990), as Clarrie Bullock
Round the Twist (1989), as "Santa Claws" in Christmas episode
Takeover (1988)
Spit MacPhee (1988), as Sergeant Joe Collins
The Last Resort (1988), as Hilary Davis
Hard Knuckle (1987), as Max
Takeover (1987), as Frank
Dancing Daze (1986), as Oliver
Brass Monkeys (1984), as Big Eye
Bodyline (1984), as Yabba
The Dismissal (1983), as Customs Officer
Watch This Space (1982), as a red alien who arrives on Earth and tries blending in, in living as a human
Daily at Dawn (1981), as Russell Ducke
Demolition (1978)

References

External links

1949 births
2002 deaths
Australian male film actors
Australian male television actors
Male actors from Sydney